Richard Edward Pasco,  (18 July 1926 – 12 November 2014) was a British stage, screen and TV actor.

Early life
Pasco was born in Barnes, London, the only child of insurance company clerk Cecil George Pasco (1897-1982) and milliner Phyllis Irene (1895-1989; née Widdison). He was educated at the King's College School, Wimbledon. He became an apprentice stage manager at the Q Theatre, before studying at the Central School of Speech and Drama, where he won the gold medal. He then spent three years with the Birmingham Repertory Company.

Career
One of his earliest screen appearances was as Teddy in Room at the Top (1959). His other films include Yesterday's Enemy (1959), Sword of Sherwood Forest (1960), The Gorgon (1964) and Rasputin, the Mad Monk (1966), all for Hammer Studios.

During his lengthy stage career, which began in 1943, he worked with the Old Vic, the Royal Court, the Royal Shakespeare Company and the National Theatre. Pasco played the part of Frank Rice in the original stage production of John Osborne's play The Entertainer (1957) with Laurence Olivier. One of his most memorable performances was in John Barton's 1974 production of Richard II for the RSC (alternating the title role and that of Bolingbroke, (pronounceed 'Bullen-brook'), with Ian Richardson). Among his radio successes were his performances of BBC Radio 4's Morning Story for BBC Pebble Mill producer David Shute. He portrayed Lieutenant-Commander Ericson in the 1980 BBC Radio adaptation of Nicholas Monsarrat's The Cruel Sea.  His TV credits include the role of Brutus in Julius Caesar and the "melancholy" Jacques in As You Like It (1979) by William Shakespeare in the BBC's Shakespeare cycle. Pasco played the leading part of Stephen Sorrell in the 1984 TV mini-series Sorrell and Son.

His later work includes Mrs. Brown (1997), the Inspector Morse episode "Dead on Time", A Dance to the Music of Time (1997), and Hetty Wainthropp Investigates (1998). He married actress Barbara Leigh-Hunt in 1967. He died aged 88 on 12 November 2014.

Filmography

References

 Obituary - The Scotsman
 Obituary - The Guardian

External links
 Richard Pasco at the British Film Institute
 Richard Pasco bio on Samling Foundation Archived from the original on 6 July 2009
 
 

1926 births
2014 deaths
Alumni of the Royal Central School of Speech and Drama
Commanders of the Order of the British Empire
English male film actors
English male television actors
People educated at King's College School, London
People from Barnes, London
Royal Shakespeare Company members
Audiobook narrators